Liwa Football Club is an Emirati professional football club based in Al Dhafra, Abu Dhabi. The club currently competes in the UAE Second Division League.

History
Liwa FC was founded in 2020 and started their first season in that same year in the UAE Second Division. They would also start a youth program in 2021 to develop the club further. Former Egyptian goalkeeper Essam El Hadary announced his administration towards the club with the goal to provide it with players and technical staff.

Current squad
As of 2021–22 season

References

External links

Football clubs in Abu Dhabi
Liwa
Association football clubs established in 2020
2020 establishments in the United Arab Emirates